DJ Dara (Darragh Guilfoyle, Brooklyn, New York) is an Irish drum and bass DJ who performs mainly in North America. He is also a co-founder (along with DJ DB) of Breakbeat Science, a drum & bass record label and store in New York.

He is also a member of the drum & bass group known as the Planet of the Drums.

Discography

Albums
 (1997) Rinsimus Maximus (CD) – Sm:)e
 (1998) Full Circle: Drum & Bass DJ Mix (CD) – Moonshine
 (1999) Renegade Continuum Vol. 2 (CD) – Rawkus Raw Kuts
 (1999) Halfway Home (CD) – Sm:)e
 (2000) From Here to There (CD) – Moonshine
 (2001) Future Perfect (CD) – Moonshine
 (2002) Further (CD) – Moonshine
 (2003) Breakbeat Science: Exercise 01 (CD) – Breakbeat Science
 (2004) The Antidote (CD) – Breakbeat Science

Singles
 (1995) Schizophrenia (12") – Smile

References
 Official Facebook Fan Page
 https://web.archive.org/web/20050708020617/http://www.breakbeatscience.com/ – Breakbeat Science
 https://web.archive.org/web/20090216224104/http://ravearchive.com/mixtapes/Dara – Dara Mixtapes - Updated May '09
 Video Interview with DJ Dara (2009) - Part 1
 Video Interview with DJ Dara (2009) - Part 2
 Discography 

Irish electronic musicians
Irish DJs
Irish drum and bass musicians
Living people
Year of birth missing (living people)